Flamingo is the common name for birds in the genus Phoenicopterus.

Flamingo, Flamingoes or Flamingos may also refer to:

Places

Topology
 Flamingo, Costa Rica, a beach
 Flamingo/Lummus, Miami Beach, Florida, United States
 Flamingo, Monroe County, Florida, a ghost town
 Flamingo Bay (disambiguation)

Airports
 Flamingo International Airport, Kralendijk, Bonaire, Netherlands Antilles

Roads
 Flamingo Road (Las Vegas)
 Flamingo Road, part of Florida State Road 823

People
 Raven (wrestler) and Scotty Flamingo, ring personae of American professional wrestler Scott Levy (born 1964)

Arts, entertainment, and media

Fictional characters
 Flamingo (comics), a DC Comics villain

Music

Groups and labels
 Flamingo Recordings, a Dutch record label
 The Flamingos, an American doo-wop group

Albums
 Flamingo (Flamin' Groovies album) (1970)
 Flamingo (Brandon Flowers album) (2010)
 Flamingo (Herbie Mann album) (1955)
 Flamingo (Olympia album) (2019)
 Flamingos (album), a 2002 album by Enrique Bunbury

Songs
 "Flamingo" (song), a 1940 song written by Ted Grouya and Edmund Anderson
 "Flamingo", a 2014 song by English group Kero Kero Bonito
 "Flamingo", a 2010 song by Venezuelan group La Vida Bohème
 "Flamingo", a 1973 song from the album A Wizard, a True Star by Todd Rundgren
 "Flamingo", a 2018 song by Japanese musician Kenshi Yonezu

Other uses arts, entertainment, and media
 Flamingo (sculpture), a 1973 sculpture by Alexander Calder in Chicago, Illinois
 Flamingo Televisión, a Venezuelan regional television station from 1990 to 2000
 Captain Flamingo, Canadian animated TV series (2006–2010)
 Flamingo (imprint), a former publishing imprint

Brands and enterprises
 Flamingo Hotel, Miami Beach, Florida, a hotel from 1921 to the 1950s
 Flamingo Las Vegas, a casino resort and hotel in Las Vegas, Nevada, United States
 Flamingo, Vantaa, an entertainment center in Vantaa, Finland
 The Flamingo Club, a club in London, England which was a meeting place for international musicians from 1957 to 1962

Military
 Flamingo, a popular name for the Panzer II Flamm tank
 , two ships
 , three ships

Sports
 Flamingo Stakes, an American Thoroughbred horse race run annually from 1926 to 2001
 Flamingoes F.C., a disbanded nineteenth century English rugby union club
 Flamingos F.C., a Namibian football club since 1986
 Florida Flamingos, a charter franchise of World Team Tennis which played only in the 1974 season before folding
 Miami Beach Flamingos, a minor league baseball team from 1940 to 1954

Transportation

Airlines
 Flamingo Air (Cincinnati airline), a small charter airline
 Flamingo Air,  two small seaplane airlines which operate between Florida and the Bahamas

Aircraft
 Aeros UL-2000 Flamingo, a Czech ultralight aircraft
 de Havilland Flamingo, a World War II era passenger airliner, also used by the Royal Air Force
 MBB 223 Flamingo, a West German 1960s light aircraft
 Metal Aircraft Flamingo, a monoplane unveiled in 1929
 Pegasus EDA 100 Flamingo, a Slovenian ultralight aircraft
 SGP M-222 Flamingo, an Austrian light aircraft first flown in 1959
 Udet U 12 Flamingo, an aerobatic sports plane and trainer aircraft developed in Germany in the mid-1920s

Group transportation
 Flamingo (train), a named overnight train operated by the Louisville & Nashville between Cincinnati, Ohio and Jacksonville, Florida
 Flamingo coupé, a car manufactured by Glass Sport Motors

Science
 Flamingo (protein), a protein involved in planar cell polarity and dendrite structure
 Flamingo flower, common name for flowers in the genus Anthurium

Other uses
 Plastic flamingo, a plastic lawn ornament
 Flamingo (horse), British thoroughbred racehorse
 , a German cargo ship in service 1938-39, later serving as the Vorpostenboot V 109 Flamingo

See also
 Flamengo (disambiguation)
 Flamenco (disambiguation)